The Padri War (also called the Minangkabau War) was fought from 1803 until 1837 in West Sumatra, Indonesia between the Padri and the Adat. The Padri were Muslim clerics from Sumatra who wanted to impose Sharia in Minangkabau country in West Sumatra, Indonesia.  The Adat comprised the Minangkabau nobility and traditional chiefs. They asked for the help of the Dutch, who intervened in 1821 and helped the nobility defeat the Padri faction.

Background
It can be considered that the Padri War actually began in 1803, prior to Dutch intervention, and was a conflict that had broken out in Minangkabau country when the Padri started to suppress what they saw as un-Islamic customs, i.e. the adat. But after occupation of the Pagaruyung Kingdom by Tuanku Pasaman, one of Padri leaders in 1815, on 21 February 1821, the Minangkabau nobility made a deal with Dutch in Padang to help them to fight the Padri.<ref>Sjafnir Aboe Nain, 2004, Memorie Tuanku Imam Bonjol (MTIB), transl., Padang: PPIM.</ref>Adat, as customary law is called in Indonesia, includes indigenous, pre-Islamic religious practices and social traditions in local custom. The Padri, like contemporaneous jihadists in the Sokoto Caliphate of West Africa, were Islamist purists who had made the hajj to Mecca and returned inspired to bring the Qur'an and shariah to a position of greater influence in Sumatra. The Padri movement had formed during the early 19th century and sought to purge the culture of traditions and beliefs its partisans viewed as un-Islamic.

In the 1820s, the Dutch had yet to consolidate their possessions in some parts of the Dutch East Indies (later Indonesia) after re-acquiring it from the British. This was especially true on the island of Sumatra, where some areas would not come under Dutch rule until the 20th century.

Padri
From c.1692, Islam was propagated to the Minangkabau areas of West Sumatra by Sheikh Burhanuddin Ulakan in the Shattari school of Sufism. In 1784, the sufi ulama called Tuanku Nan Tuo was appointed as religious head of Koto Tuo region. He appointed a large number of his students to head various surau surrounding the region. A great number of his students were Hajj returnees and were influenced by the ideals of Wahabi movement. They called themselves Padri. The Padri movement is considered one of the major precursors of Salafiyya movement of the 19th century; and influenced the Salafi reformist Muhammadiyyah movement of South East Asia.

The Padri had their extremist version of Sharia law which they would implement through violent upheaval to replace the existing Adat. Historical accounts of the Padri War reveal several different ideologies. The most influential were by Tuanku Nan Tuo, Tuan Ku Nan Renceh and Imam Bonjol.

Tuanku Nan Tuo was a Shattari Sufi leader and reformist but not a Padri. He would convince villagers to rid their society of vices like cock-fighting, gambling and opium. His methods would be through discussion, education and also public protest. All the Padri leaders were once his students and he continuously disagreed with their extremist fanaticism and militant violence. In revenge for this insolence, the Padri attacked and burnt down numerous villages which were Shattari centres; instigated mass murder of the ulama and urang cerdek (intelligentsia) as well as rape and plunder. The Padri waged war against Nan Tuo's village of Koto Tuo from 1815. Nan Tuo's sons died in battle. Koto Tuo held on until the Dutch arrived in 1821.

Tuanku Nan Renceh was an extremist Wahabbi puritan. Nan Renceh with Tuan Ku Lintau and Tuan Ku Pasaman were at war with the Adat and would forbid cock-fighting, gambling and sireh; and forced women to cover up. Any that disagreed with their interpretation of Islam were punishable by death. They grew wealthy by enslaving the population to grow coffee and other agriculture. While forcing residents to wear white and grow beards, they would wear red.

Imam Bonjol was a mystic, strategist and visionary. Imam Bonjol with Tuan Ku Rao and Tuan Ku Tambusai were based in the northern areas where the Padri War evolved differently. Many in the north were early Padri sympathisers. While they were as militant and extremist as Nan Renceh initially, their roles were quite different. While Nan Renceh was punishing the Adat population, Imam Bonjol and Rao were developing trading routes and fortresses against the Dutch. He also enslaved the Batak people. In January 1824, he signed a peace treaty with the Dutch but a new commander arrived and dishonoured it. In 1831, Imam Bonjol attacked a Dutch garrison killing off 2 thirds of the soldiers. Later, as Imam Bonjol met numerous Hajj returnees who contested the Padri and Wahabbi extremism, he began to have misgivings, doubts and regrets. By September 1832, Imam Bonjol's was disillusioned and, perhaps seeking repentance, he walked out of his village fort and left the Padri. 

Skirmishes and the Masang Treaty
Dutch involvement in the war came about because it was "invited" by the Adat faction, and in April 1821, Dutch troops attacked Simawang and Sulit Air under captains Goffinet and Dienema on the orders of James du Puy, the Dutch Resident in Padang. Between 1821–1824, skirmishes broke out throughout the region, ended only by the Masang Treaty. The war cooled down during the next six years, as the Dutch faced larger-scale uprisings in Java.

Dutch advances

The conflict broke out again in the 1830s with the Dutch gaining early victories. Soon after, the war centred on Bonjol, the fortified last stronghold of the Padri. It finally fell in 1837 after being besieged for three years, and along with the exile of Padri leader Tuanku Imam Bonjol, the conflict died out.

Impact
With the victory, the Dutch tightened their hold on West Sumatra. Yet, after the war, the traditional and religious leaders increasingly reconciled their visions. This helped promulgating the new view of "adat basandi syara', syara' basandi Kitabullah" ("tradition founded upon Islamic law, Islamic law founded upon the Qur'an").

See also

 Ruit van Bonjol
 Tuanku Imam Bonjol, leader in the Padri movement

Notes

Further reading
 
Ricklefs, M. C. (1993) A History of Modern Indonesia since c. 1300. 2d ed.  (London: Macmillan), 1993.
Tarling, Nicholas, (ed.) The Cambridge History of Southeast Asia,'', vol. II " The Nineteenth and Twentieth Centuries" (Cambridge University Press) 1992.

Dutch conquest of Indonesia
Minangkabau
History of West Sumatra
1800s conflicts
1810s conflicts
1820s conflicts
1830s conflicts
1800s in the Dutch East Indies
1810s in the Dutch East Indies
1820s in the Dutch East Indies
1830s in the Dutch East Indies
19th century in Indonesia
Islamism in Indonesia
Wars involving Indonesia
Wars involving the Netherlands
Wahhabism